An Impression of John Steinbeck: Writer is a 1969 American short documentary film directed by Donald Wrye, about John Steinbeck. It was nominated for an Academy Award for Best Documentary Short.

See also
 Henry Fonda filmography

References

External links
 
 An Impression of John Steinbeck: Writer at the National Archives and Records Administration

1969 films
1960s short documentary films
1969 independent films
American short documentary films
American independent films
Documentary films about writers
Films directed by Donald Wrye
John Steinbeck
1960s English-language films
1960s American films